Jorge Aravena (born October 1, 1969) is Peruvian-Venezuelan telenovela actor. He is known for his role in telenovelas such as Girasoles Para Lucia, La Revancha, Secreto de Amor, and Mi Vida Eres Tu.

Biography
Jorge was born in Lima to Chilean father Jorge Luis Aravena and Peruvian mother Varo Masías. At the age of 10, his parents moved to Venezuela where he grew up and started his career.

In 1995, he married Jenny Martínez. He had three children from his marriage: Jorge Luis, Claudia Valentina and Luis Fernando. However, he separated from Jenny in 2005 and filed for divorce in 2007.

Filmography

References

External links

Venezuelan male telenovela actors
Living people
1969 births
Male actors from Lima
Peruvian emigrants to Venezuela
Peruvian emigrants to Mexico
Venezuelan emigrants to Mexico